Haplochromis limax is a species of cichlid found in the Democratic Republic of the Congo and Uganda where it occurs in Lake George and Lake Edward.  This species can reach a length of  SL.

References

limax
Fish described in 1933
Lake fish of Africa
Taxonomy articles created by Polbot